Natália Zilio Pereira (born 4 April 1989) is a Brazilian professional volleyball player who won with the Brazil women's national volleyball team the gold medal in the 2012 Summer Olympics.

Career
Pereira was part of the Brazilian team who won the gold medal in the 2012 Summer Olympics.

During the 2015 FIVB Club World Championship, Pereira played with the Brazilian club Rexona Ades Rio and her team lost the bronze medal match to the Swiss Voléro Zürich. She won the Most Valuable Player award and the gold medal of the 2016 FIVB World Grand Prix. One year later, she won the 2017 FIVB World Grand Prix gold medal and the Most Valuable Player and Best Outside Spiker individual awards. Pereira won the 2017 South American Championship Best Outside Spiker.

Clubs
  Sollys Osasco (2006–2011)
  Unilever Vôlei (2011–2013)
  Vôlei Amil (2013–2014)
  Rexona Ades Rio (2014–2016)
  Fenerbahçe (2016–2018)
  Minas Tênis Clube (2018–2019)
  Eczacıbaşı VitrA (2019–2020)
  Dynamo Moscow (2020–2021)
  Savino del Bene Scandicci (2021-2022)
  Dynamo Moscow (2022–)

Awards

Individuals
 2005 FIVB U18 World Championship – "Most Valuable Player"
 2007 FIVB U20 World Championship – "Most Valuable Player"
 2007 FIVB U20 World Championship – "Best Scorer"
 2007 FIVB U20 World Championship – "Best Spiker"
 2009 South American Club Championship – "Best Spiker"
 2010 South American Club Championship – "Best Spiker"
 2015 FIVB World Grand Prix – "Best Outside Spiker"
 2016 FIVB World Grand Prix – "Most Valuable Player"
 2016–17 Turkish League – "Most Valuable Player"
 2017 Montreux Volley Masters – "Best Outside Spiker"
 2017 FIVB World Grand Prix – "Best Outside Spiker"
 2017 FIVB World Grand Prix – "Most Valuable Player"
 2017 South American Championship – "Best Outside Spiker"
 2018–19 Brazilian Superliga – "Best Outside Spiker"

Clubs
 2009–10 Brazilian Superliga –  Champion, with Sollys Osasco
 2012–13 Brazilian Superliga –  Champion, with Unilever Vôlei
 2014–15 Brazilian Superliga –  Champion, with Rexona/Ades
 2015–16 Brazilian Superliga –  Champion, with Rexona/Ades
 2016–17 Turkish League –  Champion, with Fenerbahçe
 2018–19 Brazilian Superliga –  Champion, with Itambé/Minas
 2009 South American Club Championship –  Champion, with Sollys Osasco
 2010 South American Club Championship –  Champion, with Sollys Osasco
 2013 South American Club Championship –  Champion, with Unilever Vôlei
 2015 South American Club Championship –  Champion, with Rexona/Ades
 2016 South American Club Championship –  Champion, with Rexona/Ades
 2019 South American Club Championship –  Champion, with Itambé/Minas
 2010 FIVB Club World Championship –  Runner-Up with Sollys Osasco
 2018 FIVB Club World Championship –  Runner-Up with Itambé/Minas
 2019 FIVB Club World Championship –  Runner-Up with Eczacıbaşı VitrA

References

1989 births
Brazilian women's volleyball players
Living people
Olympic volleyball players of Brazil
Volleyball players at the 2012 Summer Olympics
Volleyball players at the 2016 Summer Olympics
Olympic gold medalists for Brazil
Olympic medalists in volleyball
Medalists at the 2012 Summer Olympics
People from Ponta Grossa
Fenerbahçe volleyballers
Opposite hitters
Outside hitters
Expatriate volleyball players in Turkey
Brazilian expatriate sportspeople in Turkey
Volleyball players at the 2020 Summer Olympics
Medalists at the 2020 Summer Olympics
Olympic silver medalists for Brazil
Sportspeople from Paraná (state)